The Dado Center for Interdisciplinary Military Studies is a military studies department of the Israel Defense Forces aimed at operational level of war activities. 

It was named after rav aluf David "Dado" Elazar.

History
The Dado Center is rooted in the activities of the Operational Theory Research Institute (OTRI, Hebrew abbreviation: MALTAM), a similar organisation which was established in 1995 and dismantled in 2005, following a harsh report by the state comptroller. Brig.

Areas of activity
The Dado Center operates in three primary fields, as:
 A center for learning processes which accompanies the IDF central thinking processes. In this role, it assists in methodology and content top bodies in the IDF General Staff, heads of the regional commands, and the commanders of other top bodies in the IDF as they carry out processes of critical military analysis and development of strategies and tactics.
 A school for the development of senior military leadership in operational thought. In this role, the center prepares senior officers for positions in the IDF General Staff, and runs targeted seminars to groups of officers on learning processes and operational thought, in order to develop new organizational and operational concepts.
 A research institute that employs both civilian and military researchers for data mining and study of various subjects connected to the center's activities.

As part of its activities, the center also runs wargames for senior commanders, joint learning seminars with foreign militaries, and joint day-long seminars between the IDF and academic bodies.

Publications
As part of its role of developing learning approaches for the highest ranks in the IDF, the center develops and disseminates a series of internal professional manuals.

Since February 2014, the center publishes a journal named "Bein Haktavim" (Hebrew בין הקטבים), lit. "Between the Poles", which is edited by Brig. Gen. Eran Ortal. The journal seeks to develop IDF's knowledge processes on what's new and developing phenomena. The Dado Center Journal influences the IDF. Each issue of "Bein Haktavim" is dedicated to a different subject.

The journal is published online on the Ma'arachot publishing website, and is distributed to senior IDF commanders, government officials, research institutes, relevant civil organizations, colleges and universities.

See also
Institute for National Security Studies (Israel)

References

External links
 The Dado Center English website 
 Bein Haktavim page at the IDF homepage (in Hebrew). Accessed 2022-03-13.
 
 Special Episode - Operational Design, The Dado Center Podcast, 11 June 2021
 Ortal, Eran. "Turn On the Light, Extinguish the Fire: Israel's New Way of War", War on the Rocks web magazine, 19 January 2022.

Military units and formations of Israel
Military science
Military journals
Publications established in 2014
Quarterly journals